The Expedition of Muhammad ibn Maslamah took place in July, 627 AD in Muharram, 6AH.

Expedition
A platoon of thirty Muslims under the leadership of Muhammad bin Maslamah was despatched on a military mission. They headed for the habitation of the sept of Banu Bakr. The Muslims attacked the sept and dispersed them in all directions. The Muslims captured war booty and returned with the chief of the tribe of Banu Hanifa, called Thumamah bin Uthal Al-Hanafi.

Muhammad's Companions tied him to a pole of a Mosque. To a question posed by Muhammad, Thumamah used to say: "If you were to kill someone, then you would have to choose one of noble descent, if you were to be gracious, then let it be to a grateful man and if you were to ask for money, you would have to ask for it from a generous man." He repeated that three times on three different occasions. On the third time, the Muhammad ordered that he should be released and later he converted to Islam.

During this raid the Muslims killed ten people while others fled offering no resistance. The Muslims captured 150 camels and 3000 goats as booty

Islamic sources

Biographical literature
This event is mentioned in the works of the Muslim Jurist Tabari. The Muslim jurist Ibn Qayyim Al-Jawziyya also mentions the event in his biography of Muhammad, Zad al-Ma'ad. Modern secondary sources which mention this, include the award winning book, Ar-Raheeq Al-Makhtum (The Sealed Nectar). The event is also mentioned by the Muslim jurist Ibn Qayyim Al-Jawziyya in his biography of Muhammad, Zad al-Ma'ad.

The event is also mentioned by the Muslim scholar Ibn Sa'd in his book about Muhammad's military campaigns., he wrote about the expedition:

Hadith literature
In this expedition, the chief of the Banu Hanifa tribe was captured, he was called Thumamah bin Uthal Al-Hanafi. The Sahih Muslim hadith collection also mentions this:

 also mentions this.

See also
Military career of Muhammad
List of expeditions of Muhammad
Muslim–Quraysh War

Notes

627
Campaigns ordered by Muhammad